Ax1 or variation, may refer to:

 Honda AX-1, a motorcycle
 Roland AX-1, a keytar
 Axiom Mission 1 (AX-1), a space tourism mission to the International Space Station
 Accent Group, an Australia and New Zealand footwear and clothing company

See also

 IEEE 802.1AX
 AXI (disambiguation)
 Axl (disambiguation)
 AX (disambiguation)
 1 (disambiguation)